Jeferson Gusmao Maciel (born 20 January 1986) is a Brazilian footballer who currently plays for Osotspa Samut Prakan in the Thai League T1.

References

External links
Jeferson Gusmao Maciel profile at Thai Premier League Official Website

1986 births
Living people
Association football defenders
Brazilian expatriate footballers
Brazilian expatriate sportspeople in Thailand
Brazilian footballers
Expatriate footballers in Thailand
Thai League 1 players
Super Power Samut Prakan F.C. players
Alagoinhas Atlético Clube players
Goianésia Esporte Clube players
C.D. Feirense players